Adyaman may refer to:
 Garnovit, Armenia
 Nerkin Getashen, Armenia
 Verin Getashen, Armenia